Scott Morris may refer to:

 G. Scott Morris (born 1954), American physician
 R. Scott Morris (21st century), American author

See also
 Scott Morrison (disambiguation)
 Scott Morriss (born 1973), English bass player and illustrator